Fadden Peak is a peak,  high, located  east of Cressey Peak, between the southeast edge of the Ross Ice Shelf and the Watson Escarpment. It was named by the Advisory Committee on Antarctic Names for Dean E. Fadden, a utilitiesman with the Byrd Station winter party, 1958.  east sits a small mountain called Ivory Tower.

References 

Mountains of Marie Byrd Land